de:Hochleistungsrechnen#Hochleistungsrechner